The Chassezac is an  long river in the Lozère, Gard and Ardèche departments in southern France. It is a right tributary of the Ardèche.

Departments and communes it runs through

The following list is ordered from source to mouth : 
 Lozère: Saint-Frézal-d'Albuges, Belvezet, Chasseradès, La Bastide-Puylaurent, Prévenchères, Pied-de-Borne
 Ardèche: Sainte-Marguerite-Lafigère, 
 Gard: Malons-et-Elze
 Ardèche: Malarce-sur-la-Thines, Gravières, Les Salelles, Chambonas, Les Assions, Les Vans, Berrias-et-Casteljau, Chandolas, Beaulieu, Grospierres, Sampzon, Saint-Alban-Auriolles,

References

Rivers of France
Rivers of Occitania (administrative region)
Rivers of Auvergne-Rhône-Alpes
Rivers of Lozère
Rivers of Ardèche
Rivers of Gard